The Mayor of Taipei is the head of the Taipei City Government and is elected to a four-year term. Until the election of Tsai Ing-wen, the office was seen as a stepping stone to the presidency: presidents Lee Teng-hui, Chen Shui-bian and Ma Ying-jeou have all held this position prior to being elected president.

Taipei was elevated as a special municipality from 1967. The mayor was a position appointed by the central government from 1967 to 1994, and the first public election for Mayor of Taipei was held in 1994.

The incumbent mayor is Chiang Wan-an.

Titles of the Mayor

List of Mayors

Prefectural city era (appointed mayors)

Provincial city era (appointed mayors)

Provincial city era (directly elected mayors)

Special municipality era (appointed mayors)

Special municipality era (directly elected mayors)

Timeline

Electoral history

Taipei Mayoral Election, 1994

Taipei Mayoral Election, 1998

Taipei Mayoral Election, 2002

Taipei Mayoral Election, 2006

Taipei Mayoral Election, 2010

Taipei Mayoral Election, 2014

Taipei Mayoral Election, 2018

Taipei Mayoral Election, 2022

See also
Taipei
Mayor of New Taipei

References

Bibliography

1967 establishments in Taiwan